The United Panhellenic Organization of Youth, abbreviated EPON, was a Greek resistance organization
that was active during the Axis Occupation of Greece in World War II. EPON was the youth wing of the National Liberation Front (EAM) organization, and was established on 23 February 1943 after the merger of ten earlier political and resistance youth organizations. Along with EAM and its other affiliates, EPON was dissolved judicially at the beginning of the Greek Civil War but continued to operate illegally until 1958.

See also
 Young Communist League of Greece

References

Greek Resistance
National Liberation Front (Greece)
Youth wings of political parties in Greece
Youth wings of communist parties
1943 establishments in Greece
Organizations disestablished in 1958